Arizona Aviation Hall of Fame (AAHOF) is located in the Pima Air & Space Museum, Tucson, Arizona which recognises Arizona's "Excellence in Aviation". The Aviation Hall of Fame exhibit is located in the honored Dorothy Finley Space Gallery on the Museum grounds. AAHOF provides to its visitors a presentation that share an opportunity to educate one with noteworthy Arizona aviators.

History
AAHOF was established by a joint proclamation by the Governor of Arizona in 1985 that creates a process to induct its states notable and famous aviators into the Arizona Aviation Hall of Fame; thus paying a tribute to Arizona's long and proud aviation history.

Arizona AHOF recognizes its aviation industry leaders, pioneers in hot air ballooning of the 19th century, high-tech aerospace engineers and entrepreneurs, where these people of today who are a vital role in advanced aircraft and missile technology.

Hall of Fame Inductees

2013
Barbara McConnell Barrett
Edward Raymond Beauvais
Charles Eugene Mann
2012
Lt. Col. Mark Berent, USAF (Ret)
Ralph A. O'Neill
Arthur Van Haren, Jr.
2011
Edwin Jones Montgomery, Sr.
Peter Hollingsworth Smith
William Dillard "Billy" Walker
2010
Barbara Lee Harper
Maj. Gen. Donald L. Owens, AANG (Ret)
Clifford M. Sterrenberg
2009
Kenneth H. Dahlberg
Major General Carl G. Schneider (Ret)
Ruby Wine Sheldon
2008
Graham A. 'Lum' Edwards
Laurence E. Gesell
Arvin C. Schultz
Hewitt T. Wheless
2007
Col. Fred Cone, USMC (Ret)
Col. Roger Parrish, USAF (Ret)
Elgin Newell
Cheryl A. Stearns
2006
Harold "Bud" Abrams
Donald C. Downie
Ralph S. Johnson
James Vercellino
2005
Joseph La Placa
Roy O. McCaldin
Hugh Stewart
James Turnbow
2004
Roy M. Coulliette
Irene Leverton
John Richard Gasho Sr.
Douglas T. Nelson, USAF Major General, Ret
2003
Ralph D. "Hoot" Gibson, USAF Col., Ret.
Robert W. Waltz, USAF BGen., Ret. (1920–1995)
Darrell Artwade Sawyer
William S. Underwood, USAF Col., Ret.
2002
Brig. Gen. Joseph (Joe) Foss, USMC (Ret.)
Raymond L. (Ray) Haupt
Martha Ann Wilkins Mitchell & Michael (Mike) Mitchell
Gladys Mae Morrison
2001
Major Frederick E. Ferguson, US Army (Ret)
Gordon B. Hamilton
Robert McCall
Raymond Victor Schwanbeck

2000
LTC David Althoff, USMC (Ret)
Janet Harman Bragg
John H. "Jack" Connelly & Leland Hayward
Jack Womack
1999
Roy Spangler Davis
Ronald R. Fogleman
Ruth Dailey Helm & Dawn R. B. Seymour
Joan Fay Shankle & Clarence E. Shankle
1998
David M. Jones
Charles A. "Buck" Rowe
Francis R. "Dick" Scobee
Richard G. Snyder
1997
Frank K. "Pete" Everest
Sen. John S. McCain
A. Lee Moore
Patty Wagstaff
1996
James R. Greenwood
Anthony V. "Snag" Grossetta
Samuel Harry Robertson
William R. Sears
1995
Gerald Brown
William P. Cutter & William R. Cutter
Joseph A. Moller
R. Dixon Speas
1994
Harry B. Combs
John Clifford "Cliff" Garrett 
Lowell H. Smith
Louise Timken
1993
Col. Leon W. Gray
Col. Vernon V. Haywood
Alfred A. Hudgin
Charles O. Miller
1992
A. Howard Hasbrook
Joseph C. Lincoln
Charles W.
George Varga, Jr.
1991
Ruth R. Reinhold
George I. Steinke
Ralph G. Vaughan
Robert Woodhouse & Woodrow P. Jongeward
1990
Col. Frank Borman
Walter Douglas, Jr.
Sen. Barry M. Goldwater
Frank Luke, Jr.

See also

 North American aviation halls of fame

References

External links
 Arizona Aviation Hall of Fame at the Pima Air & Space Museum

Aviation halls of fame
Halls of fame in Arizona
Aerospace museums in Arizona
State halls of fame in the United States
Culture of Tucson, Arizona
Organizations established in 1991
1991 establishments in Arizona